Hong Kong participated in the 1998 Asian Games held in Bangkok, Thailand from December 6, 1998 to December 20, 1998. Athletes from Hong Kong succeeded in winning 5 golds, 10 silvers and 14 bronzes, making total 29 medals. Hong Kong finished thirteenth in a medal table.

References

Nations at the 1998 Asian Games
1998
Asian Games